This partial list of city nicknames in China compiles the aliases, sobriquets and slogans that cities in China are known by (or have been known by historically), officially and unofficially, to locals, outsiders or their tourism boards or chambers of commerce.

List

Additionally, several city governments have promoted the name "Oriental Geneva" for themselves. These cities include Shijiazhuang and Qinhuangdao in Hebei, Zhaoqing in Guangdong, Kunming and Dali in Yunnan, Chaohu in Anhui, and Wuxi in Jiangsu.

References

China
Lists by city in China